Ipiķi Parish is an administrative unit of Valmiera Municipality in the Vidzeme region of Latvia. It is the most far-north point of Latvia.

Towns, villages and settlements of Ipiķi parish 
Ipiķi (parish center)
Ipiķu skola
Ķirbēni

See also
Rūjiena (town)
Jeri Parish
Lode Parish
Vilpulka Parish

Parishes of Latvia
Valmiera Municipality
Vidzeme